Camden is the second studio album from Tony Tillman. Reflection Music Group released the album on August 7, 2015. He worked with Cardec Drums, Derek Minor, Dirty Rice, G ROC, Gawvi, GeeDA, Chris King, Alex Medina, and Tone Jonez, in the production of this album.

Critical reception

Awarding the album three and a half stars at New Release Today, Dwayne Lacy states, "There's nothing like real life music." Cal Moore, giving the album five stars from The Christian Manifesto, writes, "This is the kind of music that hip-hop heads can’t help but respect."

Track listing

Chart performance

References

2015 albums
Tony Tillman albums